John Adams is a 2008 American television miniseries chronicling most of U.S. President John Adams's political life and his role in the founding of the United States. The miniseries was directed by Tom Hooper and starred Paul Giamatti in the title role. Kirk Ellis wrote the screenplay based on the 2001 book John Adams by David McCullough. The biopic of Adams and the story of the first 50 years of the United States was broadcast in seven parts by HBO between March 16 and April 20, 2008. John Adams received widespread critical acclaim and many prestigious awards. The show won four Golden Globe awards and 13 Emmy awards, more than any other miniseries in history.

Plot summary

Part I: Join or Die (1770–1774)
Episode 1 opens in Boston 1770 on the cold winter night of the Boston Massacre. It portrays John Adams arriving at the scene following the gunshots from British soldiers firing upon a mob of Boston citizens.  Adams, a respected lawyer in his mid-30s known for his dedication to the law and justice, is sought as defense counsel for the accused Redcoats. Their commander, Captain Thomas Preston, asks him to defend them in court. Reluctant at first, he agrees despite knowing this will antagonize his neighbors and friends.  Adams is depicted to have taken the case because he believed everyone deserves a fair trial and he wanted to uphold the standard of justice. Adams' cousin Samuel Adams is one of the main colonists opposed to the actions of the British government. He is one of the executive members of the Sons of Liberty, an anti-British group of agitators. Adams is depicted as a studious man doing his best to defend his clients.  The show also illustrates Adams' appreciation and respect for his wife, Abigail. In one scene, Adams is shown having his wife proofread his summation as he takes her suggestions.  After many sessions in court, the jury returns a verdict of not guilty of murder for each defendant.  Additionally, the episode illustrates the growing tension over the Coercive Acts ("Intolerable Acts"), and Adams' election to the First Continental Congress.

Part II: Independence (1774–1776)
The second episode covers the disputes among the members of the Second Continental Congress toward declaring independence from Great Britain as well as the final drafting of the Declaration of Independence.  At the Continental Congresses Adams is depicted as the lead advocate for independence.  He is in the vanguard in establishing that there is no other option than to break off and declare independence. He is also instrumental in the selection of then-Colonel George Washington as the new head of the Continental Army.

However, in his zeal for immediate action, he manages to alienate many of the other founding fathers, going so far as to insult John Dickinson, who is for conciliation to the Crown, implying that the man suffers from a religiously based moral cowardice. Later, Benjamin Franklin quietly chastens Adams, saying it is "perfectly acceptable to insult a man in private. He may even thank you for it afterwards. But when you do it in public, they tend to think you are serious." This points out Adams' primary flaw: his bluntness and lack of gentility toward his political opponents, one that would make him many enemies and which would eventually plague his political career. It would also, eventually, contribute to historians' disregard for his many achievements. The episode also shows how Abigail copes with issues at home as her husband was away much of the time participating in the Continental Congress. She employs the use of then pioneer efforts in the field of preventative medicine and inoculation against smallpox for herself and the children.

Part III: Don't Tread on Me (1777–1781)

In Episode 3, Adams travels to Europe with his young son John Quincy during the Revolutionary War seeking alliances with foreign nations, during which the ship transporting them battles a British frigate. It first shows Adams' embassy with Benjamin Franklin in the court of Louis XVI of France. The old French nobility, who are in the last decade before being consumed by the French Revolution, are portrayed as effete and decadent. They meet cheerfully with Franklin, seeing him as a romantic figure, little noting the democratic infection he brings with him. Adams, on the other hand, is a plain spoken and faithful man, who finds himself out of his depth surrounded by an entertainment- and sex-driven culture among the French elite. Adams finds himself at sharp odds with Benjamin Franklin, who has adapted himself to the French, seeking to obtain by seduction what Adams would gain through histrionics. Franklin sharply rebukes Adams for his lack of diplomatic acumen, describing it as a "direct insult followed by a petulant whine". Franklin soon has Adams removed from any position of diplomatic authority in Paris. His approach is ultimately successful and was to result in the conclusive Franco-American victory at Yorktown.

Adams, chastened and dismayed but learning from his mistakes, then travels to the Dutch Republic to obtain monetary support for the Revolution. Although the Dutch agree with the American cause, they do not consider the new union a reliable and credit-worthy client. Adams ends his time in the Netherlands in a state of progressive illness, having sent his son away as a diplomatic secretary to the Russian Empire.

Part IV: Reunion (1781–1789)
The fourth episode shows John Adams being notified of the end of the Revolutionary War and the defeat of the British. He is then sent to Paris to negotiate the Treaty of Paris in 1783. While overseas, he spends time with Benjamin Franklin and Thomas Jefferson and Abigail visits him. Franklin informs John Adams that he was appointed as the first American Ambassador to Great Britain and thus has to relocate to London. John Adams is poorly received by the British during this time—he is the representative for a recently hostile power, and represents in his person what many British at the time regarded as a disastrous end to its early Empire. He meets with his former sovereign, George III, and while the meeting is not a disaster, he is excoriated in British newspapers. In 1789, he returns to Massachusetts for the first presidential election and he and Abigail are reunited with their children, now grown. George Washington is elected the first President of the United States and John Adams as the first Vice President.

Initially, Adams is disappointed and wishes to reject the post of Vice President because he feels there is a disproportionate number of electoral votes in favor of George Washington (Adams' number of votes pales in comparison to those garnered by Washington). In addition, John feels the position of Vice President is not a proper reflection of all the years of service he has dedicated to his nation. However, Abigail successfully influences him to accept the nomination.

Part V: Unite or Die (1788–1797)
The fifth episode begins with Vice President John Adams presiding over the Senate and the debate over what to call the new president. It depicts Adams as frustrated in this role: His opinions are ignored and he has no actual power, except in the case of a tied vote. He's excluded from George Washington's inner circle of cabinet members, and his relationships with Thomas Jefferson and Alexander Hamilton are strained. Even Washington himself gently rebukes him for his efforts to "royalize" the office of the Presidency, although Washington values Adams' counsel in other areas, considering him to be "reasonable company" when compared with Jefferson and Hamilton. A key event shown is the struggle to enact the Jay Treaty with Britain, which Adams himself must ratify before a deadlocked Senate (although historically his vote was not required). The episode concludes with his inauguration as the second president—and his subsequent arrival in a plundered executive mansion.

Part VI: Unnecessary War (1797–1801)
The sixth episode covers Adams's term as president and the rift between the Hamilton-led Federalists and Jefferson-led Republicans. Adams's neutrality pleases neither side and often angers both. His shaky relationship with vice president Thomas Jefferson worsens after taking defensive actions against the French Republic because of failed diplomatic attempts and the signing of the Alien and Sedition Acts. Adams also alienates himself from the anti-French Alexander Hamilton after taking all actions possible to prevent a war with France. He disowns his son Charles, who soon dies as an alcoholic vagrant. Adams sees success late in his presidency with his campaign of preventing a war with France, but his success is clouded after losing the presidential election of 1800. After receiving so much bad publicity while in office, Adams loses the election against his vice-president, Thomas Jefferson, and runner-up Aaron Burr (both from the same party). Adams leaves the Presidential Palace (now known as the White House) in March 1801 and retires to his personal life in Massachusetts.

Part VII: Peacefield (1803–1826)
The final episode covers Adams's retirement years. His home life at Peacefield is full of pain and sorrow as his daughter, Nabby, dies of breast cancer and Abigail succumbs to typhoid fever. Adams does live to see the election of his son, John Quincy, as president, but is too ill to attend the inauguration. Adams and Jefferson are reconciled through correspondence in their last years. Both die hours apart on July 4, 1826, the 50th anniversary of the Declaration of Independence. Jefferson was 83, Adams was 90.

Cast

 Paul Giamatti as John Adams
 Laura Linney as Abigail Adams
 Stephen Dillane as Thomas Jefferson
 David Morse as George Washington
 Tom Wilkinson as Benjamin Franklin
 Rufus Sewell as Alexander Hamilton
 Justin Theroux as John Hancock
 Danny Huston as Samuel Adams
 Sarah Polley as Abigail Adams Smith
 Andrew Scott as William S. Smith
 Željko Ivanek as John Dickinson
 Ebon Moss-Bachrach as John Quincy Adams
 John Dossett as Benjamin Rush
 Mamie Gummer as Sally Smith Adams
 Caroline Corrie as Louisa Adams
 Samuel Barnett as Thomas Adams
 Kevin Trainor as Charles Adams
 Tom Hollander as King George III
 Julian Firth as the Duke of Dorset
 Damien Jouillerot as King Louis XVI
 Clancy O'Connor as Edward Rutledge
 Guy Henry as Jonathan Sewall
 Brennan Brown as Robert Treat Paine
 Paul Fitzgerald as Richard Henry Lee
 Tom Beckett as Elbridge Gerry
 Del Pentecost as Henry Knox
 Tim Parati as Caesar Rodney
 John O'Creagh as Stephen Hopkins
 John Keating as Timothy Pickering
 Hugh O'Gorman as Thomas Pinckney
 Timmy Sherrill as Charles Lee
 Judith Magre as Madame Helvetius
 Jean-Hugues Anglade as Count of Vergennes
 Jean Brassard as Admiral d'Estaing
 Pip Carter as Francis Dana
 Sean McKenzie as Edward Bancroft
 Derek Milman as Lieutenant James Barron
 Patrice Valota as Jean-Antoine Houdon
 Nicolas Vaude as Chevalier de la Luzerne
 Bertie Carvel as Lord Carmarthen
 Alex Draper as Robert Livingston
 Cyril Descours as Edmond-Charles Genet
 Alan Cox as William Maclay
 Sean Mahan as Gen. Joseph Warren
 Eric Zuckerman as Thomas McKean
 Ed Jewett as James Duane
 Vincent Renart as Andrew Holmes
 Ritchie Coster as Captain Thomas Preston
 Lizan Mitchell as Sally Hemings
 Pamela Stewart as Patsy Jefferson
 Lucas N Hall as Continental Army Officer, New York light infantry battalion
 Steven Hinkle as Young John Quincy Adams
 Buzz Bovshow as John Trumbull

Shooting locations
The 110-day shoot took place from February to July 2007 in Colonial Williamsburg, Virginia; Richmond, Virginia; and Budapest, Hungary. Some European scenes were shot in Keszthely, Sóskút, Fertőd and Kecskemét, Hungary.

British officers ransacked an abandoned Continental Army war room in a scene shot in the Robert Carter house.  Williamsburg's Public Hospital was in the background of the tent encampment of the Continental army which Adams visited in the winter of 1776, which was replicated using special-effects snow. The College of William and Mary's Wren Building represented a Harvard interior. Scenes were also filmed at the Governor's Palace.

Sets, stage space, backlot and production offices were housed in an old Mechanicsville AMF warehouse in Richmond, Virginia. Some street scenes with cobblestone pavements and colonial storefronts were shot in historic neighborhoods of Washington, D.C., Boston, and Philadelphia. Countryside surrounding Richmond in Hanover County and Powhatan County was chosen to represent areas surrounding early Boston, New York, and Philadelphia.

Critical reception
The critical reception to the miniseries was predominantly positive. On review aggregator Rotten Tomatoes, the series has a rating of 82% based on 37 reviews, with an average rating of 8.56/10. The website's critics consensus reads: "Elegantly shot and relatively educational, John Adams is a worthy addition to the genre -- though its casting leaves something to be desired." Metacritic assigned the series a weighted average score of 78 out of 100, based on 27 critics, indicating "generally favorable reviews".

Ken Tucker of Entertainment Weekly rated the miniseries A−, and Matt Roush of TV Guide praised the lead performances of Paul Giamatti and Laura Linney. David Hinckley of the New York Daily News felt John Adams "is, quite simply, as good as TV gets ... Best of all are two extraordinary performances at the center: Paul Giamatti as Adams and Laura Linney as his wife, Abigail ... To the extent that John Adams is a period piece, it isn't quite as lush as, say, some BBC productions. But it looks fine, and it feels right, and sometimes what's good for you can also be just plain good."

Alessandra Stanley of The New York Times had mixed feelings. She said the miniseries has "a Masterpiece Theatre gravity and takes a more somber, detailed and sepia-tinted look at the dawn of American democracy. It gives viewers a vivid sense of the isolation and physical hardships of the period, as well as the mores, but it does not offer significantly different or deeper insights into the personalities of the men — and at least one woman — who worked so hard for liberty ... [It] is certainly worthy and beautifully made, and it has many masterly touches at the edges, especially Laura Linney as Abigail. But Paul Giamatti is the wrong choice for the hero ... And that leaves the mini-series with a gaping hole at its center. What should be an exhilarating, absorbing ride across history alongside one of the least understood and most intriguing leaders of the American Revolution is instead a struggle."

Among those unimpressed with the miniseries were Mary McNamara of the Los Angeles Times and Tim Goodman of the San Francisco Chronicle. Both cited the miniseries for poor casting and favoring style over storytelling.

Awards and nominations

Soundtrack
The score for the miniseries was composed by Robert Lane and Joseph Vitarelli. Lane wrote the main theme and scored "Join or Die," "Independence," "Unite or Die" and "Peacefield," with Vitarelli doing "Don't Tread on Me," "Reunion" and "Unnecessary War." The two composers worked independently of each other, with Lane writing and recording his segments in London and Vitarelli in Los Angeles. There are also pieces by classical composers, including Mozart, Boccherini, Gluck, Handel and Schubert. The soundtrack was released on the Varèse Sarabande label.

Historical inaccuracies
The series deviates from David McCullough's book on several occasions, using creative license throughout.

Part I
 John Adams addresses Captain Preston immediately after the massacre, while deliberating whether to defend the soldier; he says: "As of this morning, five are dead". Only three men were killed immediately: Samuel Maverick died the next morning, and Patrick Carr did not die until two weeks later.
 Around the time of the trial, John Adams' son Charles is depicted playing with his sister, though he was not born until May 29, 1770 (making him still an infant). Likewise, his older son John Quincy Adams was born in July 1767, but he is depicted as a near-adolescent.
 Samuel Adams is depicted as disapproving of John Adams's decision to defend Captain Preston and the other Boston Massacre soldiers, when no other lawyer would act as their counsel. It is implied that the Sons of Liberty also disapproved, and that John for his part disapproved of their group. In fact, Samuel Adams encouraged his cousin John to take the case. John and other leading members of the Sons of Liberty also convinced Josiah Quincy II, another cousin who was a lawyer, to aid Adams in his preparation of the case. 
 Captain Preston and the British soldiers involved in the Boston Massacre are shown being tried in a single trial in what seems to be the dead of winter, and declared not guilty of all charges. In actuality, Captain Preston's trial took place on October 24 and ran through October 29, when he was found not guilty. The eight soldiers were brought to trial weeks later in a separate trial that concluded on November 29.  Six of the soldiers were found not guilty, but Hugh Montgomery and Matthew Killroy were convicted of manslaughter. They both received brands on their right thumbs as punishment.
 John Hancock is confronted by a British customs official, and he orders the crowd to "teach him a lesson, tar the bastard". Hancock and Samuel Adams then look on while the official is tarred and feathered, to the disapproval of John Adams. The scene is fictional and does not appear in McCullough's book. According to Samuel Adams biographer Ira Stoll, there is no evidence that Samuel Adams and John Hancock, who were opposed to mob violence, were ever present at a tarring and feathering, and so the scene succeeds in "tarring the reputations of Hancock and Samuel Adams". Jeremy Stern writes, "Despite popular mythology, tarrings were never common in Revolutionary Boston, and were not promoted by the opposition leadership. The entire sequence is pure and pernicious fiction." According to Stern, the scene is used to highlight a schism between Samuel and John Adams, which is entirely fictional.
 The tar and feather scene also improperly uses a black, modern tar. In reality, the liquid known as tar in the 18th century was pine tar, a liquid which is more often light-brown in color. The tar that we know today is actually called petroleum tar or bitumen. Pine tar also has a low melting point, and would not burn the skin the way that hot petroleum tar would. 
 While in bed, Adams mentions his parents, saying his mother couldn't read. However, in his memoirs, John Adams himself wrote that "as my parents were both fond of reading...I was very early taught to read at home," indicating that his mother likely possessed at least a basic level of literacy. However, in the book McCullough does speculate that Adams' mother may have been illiterate, citing the lack of written correspondence either to or from her and evidence that she had letters read aloud to her.
 David McCullough's biography makes no mention of a pulpit speech by John Adams after being chosen, in summer 1774, to be one of Massachusetts' representatives to the First Continental Congress in Philadelphia. The text for that speech, at the end of Part I, comes mainly from two documents Adams penned during the Stamp Act crisis 8 years earlier, apparently stitched together in the film so as to evoke the similar-sounding famous passage in the United States Declaration of Independence, about men being created equal and endowed thereby with unalienable rights. Adams (instead of Jefferson) might have served as lead author of the Declaration two years later, and might have foreshadowed key portions of it oratorically before leaving Massachusetts for Philadelphia, but actually did neither. While rhetorically impressive in the film, the climactic final words of that speech, "Liberty will reign in America," appear to be a dramatic invention, not a passage Adams is known to have ever spoken or written.
When Adams is set off to join the 1774 First Continental Congress, Abigail Adams is shown pregnant with a child. Adams is seen saying if the child was a girl, they would name her Elizabeth. While Abigail did give birth to a stillborn daughter they named Elizabeth, this happened in 1777, not 1774.

Part II
 In the opening scene, the final meeting site of the First Continental Congress is incorrectly shown as the Pennsylvania State House (now known as Independence Hall). Carpenters' Hall was and still is privately owned by The Carpenters' Company of the City and County of Philadelphia. It offered more privacy than the Pennsylvania State House. The venue depicted for the Second Continental Congress, however, is correctly depicted as the Pennsylvania State House.
 Benjamin Franklin is shown being brought to the Continental Congress in a litter, but he did not use this mode of transport in Philadelphia until the Constitutional Convention, 11 years later.
 John Adams did not ride to Lexington and Concord while the battle was still in progress; he visited on April 22, several days later.
 The first version of the Declaration of Independence read by Adams' family was depicted as a printed copy; in reality, it was a copy in Adams' own hand, which led Mrs. Adams to believe that he had written it himself.
 General Henry Knox's ox-driven caravan of cannon (taken from Fort Ticonderoga) is depicted passing by the Adams' house in Braintree, Massachusetts en route to Cambridge, Massachusetts. In reality, General Knox's caravan almost certainly did not pass through Braintree.
 General Knox is played by actor Del Pentecost (b. 1963), who at the time of filming was age 45, far older than the 25 years old that Henry Knox was in 1775. 
 The illness of the daughter following the inoculation of smallpox was inaccurate. In fact, it was their son Charles who developed the pox and who was unconscious and delirious for 48 hours.

Part III
 Adams is shown departing for Europe without an upset nine-year-old son Charles, leaving only with older son John Quincy Adams. Adams actually took multiple trips to Europe. According to David McCullough's book, on one such trip young Charles accompanied his brother and father to Paris. He later became ill in Holland, and traveled alone on the troubled vessel South Carolina. After an extended journey of five months, Charles returned to Braintree at 11 years of age.
 During Adams's first voyage to France, his ship engages a British ship in a fierce battle while Adams assists a surgeon performing an amputation on a patient who dies. In reality, Adams helped perform the amputation several days after the capture of the British ship, following an unrelated accident. The patient died a week after the amputation, rather than during the operation as shown in the episode.

Part IV
 Abigail and John are depicted reuniting outside Paris after many years, but in reality were first reunited in London and traveled to Paris together.
 Abigail Adams is depicted reprimanding Benjamin Franklin for cheating on his wife in France, but his wife died seven years earlier in 1774.
 Abigail and John are depicted reuniting with their grown up children Nabby, John Quincy, Charles, and Thomas Boylston after returning to the United States, but in reality Nabby accompanied her mother Abigail to London where they reunited with John, and after joined by John Quincy, the four traveled to Paris where they stayed for a year until 1785 when John was appointed the first American ambassador to Great Britain, at which Nabby accompanied her parents to England while John Quincy returned home to Massachusetts to attend Harvard.  
 Multiple references are made in dialogue throughout the episode to the impending "Constitutional Convention." In reality, the Constitutional Convention was only referred to as such after it disbanded, since the Philadelphia convention was originally called only to revise the Articles of Confederation. When the Convention met, strict secrecy was imposed on its proceedings. It was only under this veil of secrecy that the convention goers changed their mission from one of revising the Articles to one of crafting a new constitution.

Part V
 Vice President John Adams is shown casting the tiebreaker vote in favor of ratifying the Jay Treaty. In reality, his vote was never required as the Senate passed the resolution by 20–10. Furthermore, the vice president would never be required to cast a vote in a treaty ratification because Article II of the Constitution requires that treaties receive a two-thirds vote.
Thomas Pinckney is portrayed as a Senator during the debate of whether the President would require the Senate's consent to remove Cabinet officers. Pinckney was never a Senator and at the time of the debate (July 18, 1789), Pinckney held no political position.
 Nabby Adams meets and marries Colonel William Stephens Smith upon her parents' return to America from London.  John Adams is depicted as refusing to use his influence to obtain political positions for his daughter's new husband, though Colonel Smith requests his father-in-law's assistance repeatedly with an almost grasping demeanor.  Mr. Adams upbraids his son-in-law each time for even making the request, stating that Colonel Smith should find himself an honest trade or career and not depend upon speculation. In reality, Nabby met Colonel Smith abroad while her father was serving as United States minister to France and Great Britain, and the couple married in London prior to the end of John Adams' diplomatic posting to the Court of St. James.  Both John and Abigail used their influence to assist Colonel Smith and obtain political appointments for him, although this did not curb Colonel Smith's tendency to invest unwisely.
Following his election as president, John Adams is shown delivering his inauguration speech in the Senate chamber, on the second floor of Congress Hall, to an audience of senators. The speech was actually given in the much larger House of Representatives chamber on the first floor of Congress Hall. The room was filled to capacity with members of both the House and Senate, justices of the Supreme Court, heads of departments, the diplomatic corps, and others.
Though Adams was inaugurated as president on March 4, 1797, Washington, DC would not become the capital city until November 1, 1800.  John and Abigail Adams moved in to the President's House in Philadelphia where he had been inaugurated as it was still the temporary capital city.  Adams had moved to a private home in Washington, DC during the summer of 1800 and under the provisions of the plans for Washington to become the capital, took up residency in the unfinished President's House (renamed the White House later in the century) on November 1, 1800.  His wife was home in Quincy.  She was not with him as depicted in the series.  This is especially important to note because due to her not being with him, President Adams wrote a letter to Abigail on his second night in the mansion that included a very famous quote which President Franklin Roosevelt had inscribed in the fireplace mantle in the State Dining Room--"I pray Heaven to bestow the best of Blessings on this House and on all that shall hereafter inhabit it. May none but honest and wise Men ever rule under this roof."

Part VI
 After President Adams refuses to assist Colonel Smith for the last time, Smith is depicted as leaving Nabby and their children in the care of the Adams family at Peacefield; according to the scene, his intention is to seek opportunities to the west and either return or send for his family once he can provide for them.  In reality, Smith brought his family with him from one venture to the next, and Nabby only returned to her father's home in Massachusetts after it was determined that she would undergo a mastectomy rather than continue with the potions and poultices prescribed by other doctors at that time.
 After President Adams consults with his wife as to whether he should sign the laws, Adams is seen affixing his name to the ‘Punishment for Certain Crimes Against the United States’. In reality, it is entitled ‘An Act in addition to an Act entitled “An Act for the Punishment of Certain Crimes Against the United States”. The “Act for the Punishment of Certain Crimes Against the United States” was done during the second session of the first congress on April 30, 1790, by President Washington.

Part VII
Nabby is living with her family when she discerns the lump in her right breast, has her mastectomy, and dies two years later. Smith does not return until after Nabby's death and it is implied that he has finally established a stable form of income; whether he was returning for his family as he had promised or was summoned ahead of his own schedule by the Adamses pursuant to Nabby's death is not specified. Smith was with her during and after the mastectomy, and by all accounts had thrown himself into extensive research in attempts to find any reputable alternative to treating his wife's cancer via mastectomy.  The mastectomy was not depicted in the series as it is described in historical documents.  In fact, Nabby's tumor was in the left breast. She returned to the Smith family home after her operation and died in her father's home at Peacefield only because she expressed a wish to die there, knowing that her cancer had returned and would kill her, and her husband acceded to her request. Dr. Benjamin Rush was also not the surgeon who conducted the operation which was actually performed by the noted surgeon Dr. John Warren. Throughout the miniseries, Dr. Rush is shown making occasional house calls to the Adams residence. However, this is highly unlikely as Rush's practice was in far-away Philadelphia, not New England. That said, John and Abigail did consult with Rush regarding Nabby's condition, albeit this consultation was done through the mail.
 Adams is shown inspecting John Trumbull's painting Declaration of Independence (1817) and stating that he and Thomas Jefferson are the last surviving people depicted. This is inaccurate since Charles Carroll of Carrollton, who is also depicted in the painting, survived until 1832. In fact, Adams never made such a remark. In reality, when he inspected Trumbull's painting, Adams' only comment was to point to a door in the background of the painting and state, "When I nominated George Washington of Virginia for Commander-in-Chief of the Continental Army, he took his hat and rushed out that door."
 Benjamin Rush is portrayed as encouraging Adams to start a correspondence with Thomas Jefferson after the death of Abigail Adams. Abigail's death occurred in 1818 but the Adams-Jefferson correspondence started in 1812, and Rush died in 1813.

See also
 List of television series and miniseries about the American Revolution
 List of films about the American Revolution

Notes

References

External links

 
 

2008 American television series debuts
2008 American television series endings
2000s American political television series
2000s American television miniseries
American biographical series
Films about presidents of the United States
Historical television series
HBO original programming
John Adams
Works by Tom Hooper
Television series set in the 18th century
Television series set in the 19th century
Television series by Playtone
Primetime Emmy Award for Outstanding Miniseries winners
Primetime Emmy Award-winning television series
Television shows based on biographies
Television series based on actual events
Television series about the American Revolution
Best Miniseries or Television Movie Golden Globe winners
United States Declaration of Independence
Cultural depictions of John Adams
Cultural depictions of John Quincy Adams
Cultural depictions of Samuel Adams
Cultural depictions of Benjamin Franklin
Cultural depictions of Thomas Jefferson
Cultural depictions of George Washington
Cultural depictions of George III
Cultural depictions of Louis XVI
Cultural depictions of Alexander Hamilton
Cultural depictions of John Hancock
Television shows filmed in Virginia
Television shows filmed in Hungary
Television series about presidents of the United States